The 1971 Giro d'Italia was the 54th edition of the Giro d'Italia, one of cycling's Grand Tours. The Giro began with a prologue team time trial in Lecce on 20 May, and Stage 11 occurred on 31 May with a stage from Sestola. The race finished in Milan on 10 June.

Stage 11
31 May 1971 — Sestola to Mantua,

Rest day
1 June 1971

Stage 12
2 June 1971 — Desenzano del Garda to Serniga di Salò,  (ITT)

Stage 13
3 June 1971 — Salò to Sottomarina di Chioggia,

Stage 14
4 June 1971 — Chioggia to Bibione,

Stage 15
5 June 1971 — Bibione to Ljubljana,

Stage 16
6 June 1971 — Ljubljana to Tarvisio,

Stage 17
7 June 1971 — Tarvisio to Großglockner,

Stage 18
8 June 1971 — Lienz to Falcade,

Stage 19
9 June 1971 — Falcade to Ponte di Legno,

Stage 20a
10 June 1971 — Ponte di Legno to Lainate,

Stage 20b
10 June 1971 — Lainate to Milan,  (ITT)

References

1971 Giro d'Italia
Giro d'Italia stages